Vicente Felipe Fernández Godoy (born 17 February 1999) is a Chilean professional footballer who plays as a left-back for Argentine club Talleres.

Career
In February 2023, Fernández joined Argentine club Talleres de Córdoba on a deal until the 2026 season.

Honours

Club
Universidad Católica
 Supercopa de Chile (1): 2019
 Friendlies (1): Torneo de Verano Fox Sports 2019

References

External links
 
 
 Vicente Fernández at PlaymakerStats.com

1999 births
Living people
Footballers from Santiago
Chilean footballers
Chile under-20 international footballers
Chilean expatriate footballers
Club Deportivo Universidad Católica footballers
Unión La Calera footballers
Santiago Morning footballers
Club Deportivo Palestino footballers
Talleres de Córdoba footballers
Chilean Primera División players
Primera B de Chile players
Argentine Primera División players
Chilean expatriate sportspeople in Argentina
Expatriate footballers in Argentina
Association football defenders
People from Maipo Province